Valeriu Mițul (9 March 1961 – 2 October 2021) was a Transnistrian Moldovan politician, an opponent of the separatist regime that is in power in Transnistria.

Political activity 

Mițul was a participant in the 1992 War of Transnistria on behalf of Moldovan governmental forces. He was the mayor of Corjova village, considered by separatist authorities as a suburb of Dubăsari.

As result of his opposition to authorities from Tiraspol, he was arrested several times by Transnistrian police, most recently on 13 May 2007.

Mițul was elected mayor of Corjova in the Moldovan local election, 2003, as a candidate representing the ASLMN party.  

During the Moldovan municipal elections on 3 June 2007, the Transnistrian authorities prevented the inhabitants of Corjova from participating in the elections. Mițul, who was up for re-election, received death threats.

See also 
 Human rights in Transnistria

References

External links
 Transnistrian special services did their utmost not to allow Transnistrians to consecration of church in Corjova

1961 births
2021 deaths
Transnistrian politicians
Mayors of places in Moldova
People from Corjova, Dubăsari